The 2017–18 Indian Women's League preliminary round is the qualifying round that decided the two teams out of the participating thirteen that to enter the final round of the Indian Women's League. The thirteen teams are split into two groups and the top-ranked team from each group will qualify for the final rounds.

Teams

Group A

Table

Fixtures and results

Group B

Table

Fixtures and results

Goal scorers

References

Indian Women's League
2017–18 in Indian football leagues
2017–18 domestic women's association football leagues